Recurrent series of notable public lectures are presented in various countries.

General

Australia
 The Boyer Lectures delivered by prominent Australians, broadcast annually by the Australian Broadcasting Corporation.
 The Errol Solomon Meyers Memorial Lecture, held annually at the University of Queensland in Brisbane.
 The George Ernest Morrison Lecture in Ethnology, held annually at the Australian National University in Canberra.

Canada
 The Massey Lectures are held at and sponsored by Massey College at the University of Toronto annually
 The Watts Lectures are held several times each year at the University of Toronto Scarborough

Denmark
The H.C. Ørsted Lectureship held at and sponsored by The Technical University of Denmark, annually
Public Lectures in Science (In Danish: Offentlige Foredrag i Naturvidenskab) sponsored by Faculty of Science and Technology, Aarhus University, and held in Vejle, Horsens, Herning and Aarhus.

India
Vasant Vyakhyanmala is a traditional annual spring lecture series held in Pune, India, for the last 140 years and hosted by Vaktruttvottejak Sabha.
 NITI (National Institute for Transforming India), India lectures series: Transforming India

New Zealand
 Victoria University of Wellington public lecture series.

United Kingdom
 The Dingwall Beloe Lecture Series, held at the British Museum annually, intended to make new contributions to the history of horology, with a particular international focus.
 Gresham College gives free public lectures since it was founded in 1597
 The Reith Lectures, broadcast annually on the BBC, founded in honour of Lord Reith
 The Romanes Lectures, on "any topic in the Arts, Science, or Literature", given annually at the University of Oxford founded by George Romanes
 The Royal Institution Christmas Lectures have presented scientific ideas to young people in an entertaining manner since 1825.

United States
 The Art, Technology, and Culture (ATC) Lecture Series, at University of California, Berkeley in Berkeley, CA
 The Charles Eliot Norton Lectures at Harvard University, in Cambridge, MA
 Distinctive Voices, sponsored by the National Academy of Sciences, presents lectures on a wide range of scientific and technical topics at the Beckman Center in Irvine, CA and the Jonsson Center in Woods Hole, MA
 The Morgenthau Lectures, at the Carnegie Council in New York

Social and political

United States
 The Irving E. Carlyle Lecture Series at Wake Forest University
 Landon Lecture Series at Kansas State University
 Whizin Center Public Lecture Series at the American Jewish University

Aeronautics and astronautics

United States
 Evolution of Flight Lecture Series from American Institute of Aeronautics and Astronautics (AIAA)

Computer science

Canada
 UBC CS Distinguished Lecture Series

Greece
 Distinguished Lecturer Series - Leon The Mathematician] at School of Informatics, Aristotle University of Thessaloniki

United States
 CDS Lecture Series at Intelligent Servosystems Laboratory, Institute for Systems Research at University of Maryland, College Park
 MURL Lecture Series at Multi-University/Research Laboratory (MURL) as a group of institutions:
 School of Computer Science, Carnegie Mellon University;
 Laboratory for Computer Science, Massachusetts Institute of Technology; 
 Microsoft Research; 
 School of Engineering, Stanford University; 
 Dept. of Computer Science, University of Washington; and 
 Xerox Palo Alto Research Center.

History and humanities

United Kingdom
 Caird Medal lecture series at the National Maritime Museum
 E. A. Lowe Lectures, given triennially at Corpus Christi College, University of Oxford, on palaeography
 Ford Lectures, given annually at Oxford University on British history
 Lyell Lectures, given annually at Oxford University on the history of the book or bibliography
 McKenzie Lectures, given annually at Oxford University on the history of the book, scholarly editing, textual criticism, or bibliography
 Panizzi Lectures, given annually at the British Library on a topic in bibliography or book history
 Sandars Lectures, given annually at Cambridge University on a topic in bibliography or book history
 Lees Knowles Lectures, given annually military history at Trinity College, Cambridge
 Raleigh Lectures on History at the British Academy, London, England,
 Black History for Action at Lambeth Town Hall, London, England.
 Keynes Lectures in Economics at the British Academy, London, England.

United States
 A. W. Mellon Lectures in the Fine Arts
 Chicago Humanities Festival
 Columbia Lectures in International Studies
 James Ford Bell Lecture
 Jefferson Lecture
 Massey Lectures
 Sigmund H. Danziger Jr. Memorial Lecture in the Humanities

Hungary
 Eötvös József Lecture

The Netherlands
 Nexus Lectures since 1994 
 Mosse Lectures, given annually in Amsterdam

Journalism and media studies

United States
 Robert C. Vance Distinguished Lecture Series at Central Connecticut State University

Law

United Kingdom
 Hamlyn Lectures

Mathematics and mathematical sciences

United Kingdom
 Sir David Wallace Lecture Series at Loughborough University

United States
 Spring Lecture Series at University of Arkansas

Neurosciences and mind/brain sciences

Australia
 The Melbourne Neuroscience Public Lecture Series at The Melbourne Neuroscience Institute, University of Melbourne

Canada
 Treva Glazebrook Lecture Series at University of Western Ontario

United States
 CSHL Adult Lectures at Cold Spring Harbor Laboratory
 Contemporary Neurology and Neuroscience Evening Lecture Series at Department of Neurology, University of California, Irvine
 Cognitive Neuroscience Lecture Series at Center for Neural Science|the Center for Neural Science, New York University
 Duke Neurobiology Lecture Series at Department of Neurobiology, Duke University Medical Center
 Frontiers in Neuroscience Lecture Series by the Graduate Program in Neuroscience, Emory University
 Gardner Murphy Memorial Lecture Series by the American Society for Psychical Research
 HHMI's Neuroscience Lecture Series at Howard Hughes Medical Institute
 IHF Distinguished Lecture Series on Brain, Learning and Memory at Irvine Health Foundation
 Interdisciplinary Seminar at Oklahoma Center for Neuroscience (OCNS)
 Distinguished Lecturer Series at UC Davis M.I.N.D. Institute
 Mind, Brain and Behavior Distinguished Lecture Series at Center for Cognitive Neurosciences, Duke University
 Mind/Brain Lecture Series at Swartz Foundation
 MNIF Public Lecture Series at Montana Neuroscience Institute Foundation
 Neuroscience Lecture Series at University of Wisconsin–Madison
 NRC Lecture Series at Neuroscience Research Center, University of Texas Health Science Center at Houston
 NUIN Lecture Series at the Northwestern University Institute for Neuroscience
 Pinkel Endowed Lecture Series at Institute for Research in Cognitive Science, University of Pennsylvania
 Wyeth Distinguished Lecture Series in Behavioral Neuroscience at Rutgers University
 Yerkes Neuroscience Lecture Series by Neuroscience Division, Yerkes National Primate Research Center

Physics

Canada
 Perimeter Institute's Public Lecture Series at Perimeter Institute

United Kingdom
 Sir Nevill Mott Lecture Series at Loughborough University

United States
 Fermilab Lecture Series at Fermilab
 Henry Norris Russell Lectureship before the American Astronomical Society
 Jansky Lectureship before the National Radio Astronomy Observatory
 Leon Pape Memorial Lecture Series at California State University at Los Angeles
 Lyman Parratt Lecture Series at Cornell University
 Theodore von Kármán Lecture Series at Jet Propulsion Laboratory (JPL)
 Richtmyer Memorial Award Lectureship, by the American Association of Physics Teachers

Medical sciences

Italy
 Giuseppe Bigi Memorial Lecture Series, Milan

Science

Spain
 Program ConCiencia at the University of Santiago de Compostela

References

 
Public lecture series